In mathematics, physics and engineering, the sinc function, denoted by , has two forms, normalized and unnormalized.

Alternatively, the unnormalized sinc function is often called the sampling function, indicated as Sa(x).

 for all real .

The normalization causes the definite integral of the function over the real numbers to equal 1 (whereas the same integral of the unnormalized sinc function has a value of ).

The normalized sinc function is the Fourier transform of the rectangular function with no scaling. It is used in the concept of reconstructing a continuous bandlimited signal from uniformly spaced samples of that signal.

In both cases, the value of the function at the removable singularity at zero is understood to be the limit value 1. The sinc function is then analytic everywhere and hence an entire function.

The term sinc  was introduced by Philip M. Woodward in his 1952 article "Information theory and inverse probability in telecommunication", in which he said that the function "occurs so often in Fourier analysis and its applications that it does seem to merit some notation of its own", and his 1953 book Probability and Information Theory, with Applications to Radar.
The function itself was first mathematically derived in this form by Lord Rayleigh in his expression (Rayleigh's Formula) for the zeroth-order spherical Bessel function of the first kind.

Properties 

The local maxima and minima of the unnormalized sinc correspond to its intersections with the cosine function. This follows from the derivative of the sinc function:

The first few terms of the infinite series for the  coordinate of the -th extremum with positive  coordinate are

where

and where odd  lead to a local minimum, and even  to a local maximum. Because of symmetry around the  axis, there exist extrema with  coordinates .

The normalized sinc function has a simple representation as the infinite product:

and is related to the gamma function  through Euler's reflection formula:

Euler discovered that

and because of the product-to-sum identity

Euler's product can be recast as a sum

The continuous Fourier transform of the normalized sinc (to ordinary frequency) is :

This corresponds to the fact that the sinc filter is the ideal (brick-wall, meaning rectangular frequency response) low-pass filter.

This Fourier integral, including the special case

is an improper integral (see Dirichlet integral) and not a convergent Lebesgue integral, as

The normalized sinc function has properties that make it ideal in relationship to interpolation of sampled bandlimited functions:
 The functions  ( integer) form an orthonormal basis for bandlimited functions in the function space , with highest angular frequency  (that is, highest cycle frequency ).

Other properties of the two sinc functions include:
 The unnormalized sinc is the zeroth-order spherical Bessel function of the first kind, .
 where  is the sine integral, 
 Using normalized sinc, 
 
 
 
 The following improper integral involves the (not normalized) sinc function:

Relationship to the Dirac delta distribution 

The normalized sinc function can be used as a nascent delta function, meaning that the following weak limit holds:

This is not an ordinary limit, since the left side does not converge. Rather, it means that

for every Schwartz function, as can be seen from the Fourier inversion theorem.

A similar situation is found in the Gibbs phenomenon.

Summation 
All sums in this section refer to the unnormalized sinc function.

The sum of the squares also equals :

When the signs of the addends alternate and begin with +, the sum equals :

The alternating sums of the squares and cubes also equal :

Series expansion 
The Taylor series of the unnormalized  function can be obtained from that of the sine:

The series converges for all . The normalized version follows easily:

Euler famously compared this series to the expansion of the infinite product form to solve the Basel problem.

Higher dimensions 
The product of 1-D sinc functions readily provides a multivariate sinc function for the square Cartesian grid (lattice): , whose Fourier transform is the indicator function of a square in the frequency space (i.e., the brick wall defined in 2-D space). The sinc function for a non-Cartesian lattice (e.g., hexagonal lattice) is a function whose Fourier transform is the indicator function of the Brillouin zone of that lattice. For example, the sinc function for the hexagonal lattice is a function whose Fourier transform is the indicator function of the unit hexagon in the frequency space. For a non-Cartesian lattice this function can not be obtained by a simple tensor product. However, the explicit formula for the sinc function for the hexagonal, body-centered cubic, face-centered cubic and other higher-dimensional lattices can be explicitly derived using the geometric properties of Brillouin zones and their connection to zonotopes.

For example, a hexagonal lattice can be generated by the (integer) linear span of the vectors

Denoting

one can derive the sinc function for this hexagonal lattice as

This construction can be used to design Lanczos window for general multidimensional lattices.

See also

 
 
 
 
 
 
 
 
 
 
  (cartography)
 Sinhc function

References

External links 
 

Signal processing
Elementary special functions